Mónica López (born 30 May 1969) is a Spanish actress. She appeared in more than forty movies since 1991.

Selected filmography
Film

Television

References

External links 

1969 births
Living people
Spanish film actresses
21st-century Spanish actresses